Bernaldo Antonio Manzano Varón (born 2 July 1990) is a Venezuelan footballer who plays for Deportivo Lara as a midfielder.

International career
Manzano made his professional debut for the Venezuela national football team in a 1-1 friendly tie with Ecuador on 1 June 2019.

References

External links
 

Living people
1990 births
People from Portuguesa (state)
Venezuelan footballers
Venezuelan expatriate footballers
Venezuela international footballers
Association football midfielders
Portuguesa F.C. players
Asociación Civil Deportivo Lara players
Deportes Tolima footballers
Atlético Bucaramanga footballers
Categoría Primera A players
Venezuelan Primera División players
Venezuelan expatriate sportspeople in Colombia
Expatriate footballers in Colombia
2021 Copa América players